The Collar of Honour is a state decoration of Sudan established in 1956 after Sudan independence. The collar is awarded to the Head of state of Sudan and foreign countries.

It is not permissible to repeat awarding of decorations and medals, or to rise from one class to a higher one, except after the lapse of at least three years from the date of awarding them. This period is reduced to one year for employees if they are referred to retirement. Orders and medals remain the property of the awardee, and their heirs as a souvenir without any of them having the right to carry it. Without prejudice to any other punishment stipulated in the laws of Sudan, it is permissible, by order of the President of the Republic, to strip the bearer of a necklace, sash, medal, medallion, cloak of honour, or belt if they commit an act that is dishonourable or inconsistent with loyalty to the state.

Insignia 
The collar is a chain of gold with two branches of decorative units in an Islamic style, and each unit is connected to the other with an oval ring. The length of the chain is 36 inches, in the middle of which is a drawing of the emblem of the Democratic Republic of Sudan (Secretarybird). The collar has a gold ornament that connects to the chain with a clasp - and the ornament is of an Islamic style adorned with three green gemstones with a red sapphire in the middle - and in its centre is a prominent drawing of four crescents that symbolise religion, goodness, prosperity and happiness. It is worn around the neck and is accompanied by a large medal (medallion) carried on the chest on the left side. The medallion consists of two surfaces; the lower one is a sun in which there are successive oval shapes of white enamel, in the middle of which is a geometric decoration of enamel in the colours of the flag of the Democratic Republic of Sudan. The upper one is composed of the same ornamental shape connected to the chain. In the case of the military, the necklace follows a light blue colour of wavy silk, with two white lines and two thin lines.

Notable recipients 

 1958 Hassan II of Morocco
 1959 Josip Broz Tito
 1964 Elizabeth II
 1964 Prince Philip, Duke of Edinburgh
 1974 Mohammad Reza Pahlavi
 2014 Tamim bin Hamad Al Thani
 2017 Recep Tayyip Erdoğan
 2018 Salva Kiir Mayardit
 Hosni Mubarak
 Faisal of Saudi Arabia

References 

Orders, decorations, and medals of Sudan
Awards established in 1961